Huggins may refer to:

People
Albert Huggins (born 1997), American football player
Bob Huggins (born 1953), American college basketball coach
Charles Brenton Huggins (1901–1997), Canadian-born American physician, physiologist, and cancer researcher
Charlie Huggins (born 1947), member of the Alaska Senate
Colin Huggins (born 1978), American classical pianist and busker
Derek Huggins (born 1940), gallerist and founding director of the National Arts Council of Zimbabwe
Godfrey Huggins, 1st Viscount Malvern (1883–1971), Rhodesian politician, fourth Prime Minister of Southern Rhodesia, first Prime Minister of the Federation of Rhodesia and Nyasaland, and physician
Peter Jeremy William Huggins, known as Jeremy Brett (1933–1995), English actor
Jack Huggins (1886–1915), English footballer
John Huggins (1945–1969), American Black Panther party political activist
Johnny Huggins (born 1976), American football player
Margaret Lindsay Huggins (1848–1915), British astronomer; pioneer in the field of spectroscopy
Maurice Loyal Huggins (1897–1981), scientist and chemist
Miller Huggins (1879–1929), American professional baseball player and manager
Roy Huggins (1914–2002), American novelist, screenwriter, and television producer
Waymond C. Huggins (1927–2016), American politician
William Huggins (1820–1884), English animal artist
William Huggins (1824–1910), British astronomer

Fictional characters
Henry Huggins, character in a series of juvenile fiction novels by Beverly Cleary

Places
Huggins, Missouri, USA
Huggins (lunar crater)
Huggins (Martian crater)

Science
Flory–Huggins solution theory, mathematical model of the thermodynamics of polymer solutions

See also
Higgins (disambiguation)